Futuna Island may refer to 

Futuna (Wallis and Futuna), one of the Horne Islands, belonging to the French territory of Wallis and Futuna
Futuna Island, Vanuatu, an island in the Tafea province of Vanuatu